Hypericum pubescens is a perennial herb in the Hypericaceae family. It is in the section Adenosepalum.

Description
The species grows from 0.1 to 0.7 meters tall. Their stems are green to pale red and their petals are pale to bright yellow.

Distribution
Hypericum pubescens is found in Northern Africa and Spain and Portugal.

References

pubescens
Flora of North Africa
Flora of Spain
Flora of Portugal
Taxa named by Pierre Edmond Boissier
Flora of Malta